Achappam ('achu' meaning mould and 'appam' meaning food made with flour) is a deep fried rose cookie made with rice flour. It is a signature Syrian Christian food believed to come from Dutch influence. In Kerala, it is an essential snack for Christians on special days such as Christmas and marriage ceremonies. It has since spread to South East Asia where it has various local names such as kuih loyang (brass), acuan (mould), cap (stamp), bunga ros (rose flower), bunga durian (durian flower), goyang (shake), kembang loyang, dok jok(water lettuce), etc.

Preparation 
Achappam is made using patterned irons or molds to give a characteristic size, shape, and surface impression. The iron is heated to a very high temperature in oil, dipped into the batter, then re-immersed in the hot oil to create a crisp shell around the metal. The iron is lifted from the oil after the cookie separates from the iron.

Achappam batter is made from a blend of wheat flour or rice flour, eggs, sugar and coconut milk.

Achappam can be eaten plain and is also commonly spiced with sesame, cumin, and cardamom.

See also
 Appam
 Kokis
 List of fried dough varieties
 Struva

References

Indian pastries
Christmas food
Kerala cuisine
Indian snack foods
Deep fried foods